2021 SG is a near-Earth asteroid, with an estimated diameter of 42 to 94 meters, that passed about half a lunar distance from Earth on 16 September 2021. It approached from the direction of the Sun, so it was invisible until a day later. It completes its highly eccentric orbit in 2.24 years. 2021 SG is an Apollo asteroid with a 1.71 AU semimajor axis, and a 0.473 AU perihelion (near Mercury at perihelion) out to a 2.95 AU aphelion (between Mars and Jupiter). With an absolute magnitude (H) of 24.0, it is possibly the largest asteroid to pass within 1 lunar distance of Earth during 2021.

References

External links 

 

Discoveries by the Zwicky Transient Facility
Minor planet object articles (unnumbered)
20210917
20210917